A holding pond can refer to:
 a detention basin adjacent to rivers to temporarily store water as a protection against flooding
 a pond created to store waste material, such as red mud

See also:
 Retention basin, used to manage stormwater runoff to prevent flooding and downstream erosion, and improve water quality 
 Settling basin – for treating agricultural & industrial wastewater